Sawley Cricket Club is an amateur cricket club based in Long Eaton, Derbyshire, England. The club has a history dating back to the early 19th century.

Ground
The home ground is located on West Park, Long Eaton, Derbyshire and has access to three pitches. The 1st and 2nd XI teams use the Bill Camm pitch, rated by the Derbyshire County Cricket League as a Grade A+ ground, and the 3rd and 4th XI use the Graham Draycott pitch, rated as a Grade B ground.

History
The earliest known record of cricket associated with the village of Sawley is the announcement of a fixture in the Nottingham Review dated 15 August 1834 stating "A Cricket Match between the first eleven of Sawley and Shardlow...", but the earliest known match report is of a match between Ockbrook and 'Sawley Club', printed in the Derby and Chesterfield Reporter on the 27th October 1843. Evidence stating when Sawley Cricket Club was formally established is found in the Derbyshire County Cricket League archives, listing Sawley Cricket Club as founded in 1870. The ground at this time, called the ‘Trent Bridge Ground’, was situated behind the 'Harrington Arms' adjacent to the Harrington Bridge on the main road to Birmingham on the River Trent in Sawley. Cricket was played at the ground until the early 1960s, when it was eventually abandoned due to frequent flooding by the nearby River Trent and poor ground conditions.

In 1962, Parkside CC was formed and an amalgamation with Sawley CC took place in 1969. Sawley Park, in Sawley, became the new venue in 1965. In 1971, Sawley CC joined the Derbyshire Border League and continued to strive to improve playing standards and win trophies. October 1979 saw the amalgamation with Sawley Nomads CC. The new ground now being used was on West Park, Long Eaton.

Sawley Nomads CC had a history, being formed in 1950 as the Long Eaton County Billiard Hall CC. This name was subsequently changed to Long Eaton Nomads CC and in 1964 to Sawley Nomads CC.

One of Sawley's most successful decades in recent times was during the 1990s, when the club won many cup titles and ultimately became Derbyshire County Cricket League Champions in 1997. Two years later, when the top flight division of the Derbyshire County League became an ECB Premier Division, Sawley CC amalgamated with its smaller neighbour Long Eaton Park CC, to become one of the largest clubs in the district. Sawley & Long Eaton Park CC, as it became known, was one of only two clubs in the Derbyshire County Cricket League to field five senior XI teams.

Long Eaton Park CC started life as Bourne Primitive Methodist CC in 1890, amalgamating with Bethel CC in 1934. Following on from the Second World War, the name was changed to Long Eaton Methodist CC. In the early 1980s, the building of the Graham Draycott pavilion on West Park caused constitutional problems with the Church connection. The club was renamed Long Eaton Park CC to allow the establishment of a bar and to play Sunday cricket. It was during the 1980s that Long Eaton Park CC achieved a Division 7 championship win in 1985, 2 Division 5 wins (1986, 1989) and won the Wright Cup in 1987. As a result of the amalgamation, the club added Long Eaton Park to the club name and acquired the Graham Draycott pavilion. The Sawley CC pavilion (named after Bill Camm, a Sawley councillor, prominent local politician and former president of the club) was refurbished and a scorebox added in 2007. The Graham Draycott Pavilion was extended to provide more changing rooms, for both male and female players.

In 2021, after two successful decades of cricket as Sawley & Long Eaton Park CC, the club changed the club name back to Sawley Cricket Club to help reduce confusion with its other neighbour Long Eaton Cricket Club, also based on West Park. As part of the re-brand, the club colours were formally changed from the historical Blue and White to Green and Yellow, in line with the club training kit colours that had been informally adopted by the club for the best part of 30 years.

The club currently has four senior teams competing in the Derbyshire County Cricket League and a long established junior training section that play competitive cricket in the Erewash Young Cricketers League.

Club Performance
The Derbyshire County Cricket League competition results showing the club's positions in the league (by Division) since 2002.

The Newark Club Cricket Alliance Sunday League competition results showing the club's position (by Division) since 2015.

Club Honours

Events on film

Female Cricket
  Hopkins becomes first female captain in men's cricket in Derbyshire
  Cricket's leading lady: 'When I rock up on a Saturday I'm one of the boys'

Cricket Force
  England internationals Jenny Gunn and Katherine Brunt at the club in 2011
  NatWest Cricket Force 2011 with Mike Gatting, Ajmal Shahzad and Michael Vaughan

See also
Club cricket

References

External links
 Michael Vaughan and Mike Gatting help in Sawley's cricket ground makeover
 Official Club website
 The Club Play-Cricket website
 Sawley CC on Youtube
 Derbyshire County Cricket League Official Play-Cricket website

English club cricket teams
Cricket in Derbyshire
1870 establishments in England
Club cricket